Asta Film is a Danish film production company.

History 
Asta Film was founded in 2002 by Per Holst, who came from a position as creative director in Nordisk Film. In October 2010 producer Michael Bille Frandsen bought 50% of the company and became partner.

Filmography 
 Jungledyret Hugo 3 (2007)
 Max Pinlig (2008)
 Brotherhood (2009)
 Simon (2011)
 Max Pinlig 2 (2011)
 Max Pinlig på Roskilde – nu med mor (2012)
 De standhaftige (2015)

See also 
 Fridthjof Film

References

External links 
 Official website
 

Film production companies of Denmark
Mass media companies based in Copenhagen
Mass media companies established in 2002
Danish companies established in 2002
Companies based in Copenhagen Municipality